Gregory Liebenberg (born 22 December 2001) is a Zimbabwean cricketer. He made his first-class debut on 26 February 2020, for Rangers in the 2019–20 Logan Cup.

References

External links
 

2001 births
Living people
Zimbabwean cricketers
Rangers cricketers
Place of birth missing (living people)